Arylsulfatase E, also known as ARSE, is an enzyme that, in humans, is encoded by the ARSE gene.

Function 

Arylsulfatase E is a member of the  arylsulfatase subfamily of sulfatase enzymes that catalyze the hydrolysis of sulfate esters. It is glycosylated postranslationally and localized to the golgi apparatus. Sulfatases are essential for the correct composition of bone and cartilage matrix.

Clinical significance 

Deficiencies in ARSE are associated with X-linked recessive chondrodysplasia punctata, a disease characterized by abnormalities in cartilage and bone development.

References

Further reading

External links